Aorotrema is a genus of sea snails, marine gastropod mollusks in the family Tornidae within the superfamily Truncatelloidea.

Species
Species within the genus Aorotrema include:
 Aorotrema cistronium (Dall, 1889)
 Aorotrema humboldti (Hertlein & Strong, 1951)
 Aorotrema pontogenes (Schwengel & McGinty, 1942)
Species brought into synonymy
 Aorotrema erraticum Pilsbry & McGinty, 1945: synonym of Turbo castanea Gmelin, 1791

References

External links
  To World Register of Marine Species

 
Tornidae